Anavyssos is a town and a former municipality in East Attica, Greece located in the Athens Riviera. Since the 2011 local government reform it is part of the municipality Saronikos, of which it is a municipal unit. The municipal unit has an area of 14.478 km2. At the 2011 census it had 6,202 inhabitants.

It is situated near the Saronic Gulf coast, at the foot of the Olympos hill (487 m). It is 2 km north of Palaia Fokaia, 4 km east of Saronida, 10 km west of Lavrio and 34 km southeast of Athens city centre. The Greek National Road 91 (Athens - Sounion) passes south of the town, along the coast.

Anavyssos is located on the area of the ancient Attica's demos of Anaflystos (Ανάφλυστος), which has shown significant archaeological findings like Kroisos Kouros that is exhibited in the National Archaeological Museum of Athens.

The contemporary settlement was originally a village founded by Greek refugees who resettled there after fleeing from various areas of Asia Minor after the Asia Minor Campaign.

Anavyssos is the place where Elias Venezis, one of the most important Greek novelists of the 20th century located his 1939 novel 'Tranquility' (Γαλήνη). Today Anavyssos is a major coastal resort of Attica famous for water-sports, the town sees its population tripled during the summer months.

In addition to the main part of the town, Anavyssos includes a number of satellite settlements such as Ag. Nikolaos, Mavro Lithari, Paralia Anavyssou, Lakka, Alykes etc.

Historical population

Climate

According to the meteorological station of the National Observatory of Athens and the Hellenic Centre for Marine Research, Anavyssos has a hot semi-arid climate with mild winters, hot summers and very low annual precipitation at only 315 mm.

See also
List of settlements in Attica
Athens Riviera

References

External links
 World City Pages

Populated places in East Attica